Horqin may refer to:

Horqin District, in Tongliao, Inner Mongolia, China
Horqin Left Back Banner, subdivision of Inner Mongolia, China
Horqin Left Middle Banner, subdivision of Inner Mongolia, China
Horqin Right Front Banner, subdivision of Inner Mongolia, China
Horqin Right Middle Banner, subdivision of Inner Mongolia, China
Ar Horqin Banner, subdivision of Inner Mongolia, China